Prestwich is a town in the Metropolitan Borough of Bury, Greater Manchester, England,  north of Manchester city centre,  north of Salford and  south of Bury.

Historically part of Lancashire, Prestwich was the seat of the ancient parish of Prestwich-cum-Oldham, in the hundred of Salfordshire. The Church of St Mary the Virgin—a Grade I listed building—has lain at the centre of the community for centuries.

The oldest part of Prestwich, around Bury New Road, is known as Prestwich Village. There is a large Jewish community in Prestwich which, together with neighbouring Whitefield, Cheetham Hill, Crumpsall and Broughton Park, forms the second-largest in the United Kingdom.

History

Toponymy 
Prestwich is possibly of Old English origin, derived from preost and wic, which translates to the priest's farm. Another possible derivation is priest's retreat. Wic was a place-name element derived from the Latin vicus, place. Its most common meaning is dairy-farm.
The township was variously recorded as Prestwich in 1194, Prestwic in 1202 and Prestewic in 1203.

History

Bury New Road roughly follows the line of a Roman road connecting forts at Mamucium (Manchester) and Bremetennacum (Ribchester). It is possible that a Roman fort or encampment was built at "Castle Hill", near the Salford border, mirroring an encampment on Rainsough Hill equidistant from the Roman road. John Booker B.A., 19th century author and curate of the parish church, considered these were agrarian camps built to protect cattle kept in the woods of Broughton and Kersal. The camp was "just to the right of the old road to Bury, immediately beyond Singleton Brook, on the first field in the Parish of Prestwich, which was formerly known as Lowcaster". Roman coins have been found off Bury New Road, near Prestwich Golf Course and some in Prestwich Clough.

A hoard of 65 silver coins from the reign of King Stephen was found in the Sedgley Park area in 1972. The Prestwich manor emerged in the Middle Ages and in 1212 was assessed as four oxgang of land held by Adam de Prestwich whose father, Robert held it in 1193. The lord of the manor held the advowson for the church. Another Adam de Prestwich settled the manors of Prestwich, Alkrington and Pendlebury on his son John in 1297 but remarried and in 1313 settled the same manors on Thomas de Prestwich, his son by second wife. Thomas de Prestwich had daughters, Margaret who became a nun at Seaton Priory in 1360, but left the convent to marry Robert de Holland, and Agnes who married John de Radcliffe but died childless in 1362. Thomas de Prestwich granted his manors to Richard de Radcliffe for life and after that the manor was held by Richard de Langley. In 1371 Robert de Holland claimed the manor as the right of his wife. Roger de Langley was a minor and ward of the Duke of Lancaster in 1372 when Robert de Holland and a troop of armed men took possession of the manor by force and retained it until 1389. The Langleys regained the manor after 1403.

After Sir Robert Langley's death in 1561 the manor passed to his daughter Margaret, who married John Reddish. Their granddaughter Sarah married Clement Coke and the manor descended in the Coke family, until 1777, when Thomas William Coke, Coke of Norfolk, a leader in the agricultural revolution sold the land in Prestwich to increase his Norfolk estates. The manor was acquired by Peter Drinkwater of Irwell House in 1794 and it descended to his son Thomas who died in 1861. Irwell House and Drinkwater Park was sold to Salford Corporation and Prestwich Council. In 1561 other lands went to Sir Robert's other daughters. Polefield, on higher ground to the north of Prestwich, became a separate estate, with Polefield Hall coming in the 19th century to the Earls of Wilton.

In the hearth tax of 1666 there were 97 hearths in the township, the rector's house was the largest with ten. In the 17th and 18th centuries local government was based on the parish structure. The lord of the manor administered land tenure and inheritance, but law and order was kept by parish constables assisted by the church wardens. The local justices sat in the "Star Chamber" in the Ostrich Inn, now the Church Inn, close to the parish church where the justices' seat can still be seen. The village had stocks which remained in use until 1800.

The settlement grew to serve the parish church making Church Lane the historic centre. In the late 18th century the area was mainly rural with scattered farms and small settlements grew at Great and Little Heaton. The population was estimated at 670. Rooden Lane which became part of Bury Old Road was a centre for hand loom weaving and at Simister and neighbouring Bowlee, silk weaving was established. During the 19th century another settlement grew around the junction of Fairfax Road and Bury New Road along with another village centre on Bury Old Road. The area between these centres remained rural, however, the arrival of the railway in 1881 encouraged affluent merchants from Manchester to build villas and move to the town. By 1912 the population had increased to 12,800, and from the 1930s onwards the remaining fields were developed and by 1961 the population reached 31,000 and Prestwich had become a suburb of Manchester.

Prestwich Hospital was built as an asylum in 1851 and by 1900 it had grown into the largest asylum in Europe.

Governance

Prestwich was the ecclesiastical centre of Prestwich-cum-Oldham an ancient parish in the Salford Hundred of Lancashire. It was in Manchester Poor Law Union (PLU) from 1841 to 1850 and the Prestwich PLU from 1850 to 1915 when it rejoined Manchester PLU until its abolition in 1930. In 1867 the Prestwich Local Board of Health was established which, as a result of the Local Government Act 1894, became Prestwich Urban District to which parts of Great and Little Heaton townships were added. In 1903 Heaton Park was added to the City of Manchester and in 1933 part of the urban district west of the Irwell was added to Swinton and Pendlebury Urban District. Prestwich became a municipal borough in 1939. Under the Local Government Act 1972 it became an unparished area in the Metropolitan Borough of Bury in Greater Manchester, taking effect on 1 April 1974. The old Prestwich Town Hall has since been converted into a block of flats.

Prestwich, together with Whitefield and Radcliffe, is part of the marginal Bury South Parliamentary constituency, which has been represented by MP Christian Wakeford since 2019, who gained it from Labour by 402 votes, making it one of the most marginal in the country. However he then defected to Labour in January 2022. It was previously represented by Ivan Lewis who was first elected for Labour in 1997, however due to allegations of indecent behaviour towards women was suspended from the party in 2018 and since resigned from the party to serve as an independent, and stood as an Independent in the 2019 election. Prior to this it was represented by Conservative David Sumberg since the constituency's creation in 1983. Prestwich was previously paired with the neighbouring town of Middleton in the Middleton and Prestwich constituency first created in 1918.

On Bury Council Prestwich is served by three wards, St Mary's, covering the western half of the town, Holyrood covering the north-east and Sedgeley to the south. Over the years they have been represented by all three major political parties, currently with Labour marginally holding St Mary's over the Lib Dems, Sedgeley being represented by a mixture of Conservative and Labour councillors, while Holyrood is a Liberal Democrat stronghold.

Geography
Prestwich lies to the east of the River Irwell and is bounded on the north by Whitefield, on the east by Heaton Park, to the west by the Prestwich Forest Park and the Irwell Valley (Agecroft and Clifton) and to the south by the City of Salford. The two main north–south roads passing from central Manchester to Bury, Bury New Road (A56) and Bury Old Road, traverse the district.

The geology of the area is characterised by carboniferous coal measures of the Manchester Coalfield and sandstone appertaining to the Carboniferous Westphalian C geological age. This is overlain with quaternary glacial drift comprising sand, gravel and boulder clay.

Demography
From the 1991 census the population of Prestwich was estimated at 33,047. An estimated 19% of the population of Prestwich and Whitefield are Jewish and are part of the second largest Jewish community in the UK outside London, which also reaches over the border into Salford's Broughton and Manchester's districts of Crumpsall and Cheetham Hill.

The area in the south of Prestwich known as Sedgley Park has a very sizeable Jewish population and is served by some five synagogues. There are many Jewish businesses, specialist shops and delicatessens along King's Road, Bury New Road and Bury Old Road.

Population change

Economy

Prestwich has a wide range of traditional and superstore shopping. Jewish-owned shops give Prestwich a particular distinction. The Longfield Centre, a shopping precinct and civic centre, which includes the Longfield Suite, Library, Health Centre, and NHS drop-in centre was built in the 1970s.
Prestwich is now considered to be an affluent area and has been called the "Didsbury of North Manchester".

Transport

Public transport in Prestwich is coordinated by Transport for Greater Manchester. It has good transport links to Manchester city centre, Bury and other parts of Greater Manchester. High frequency services are mostly provided by Go North West. There are local bus routes, linking Prestwich village to northern areas of Salford including Pendlebury, Swinton, Monton and Eccles. The Lancashire Way and The Witch Way express services link Prestwich to Manchester, Burnley and Pendle.

The first road to be turnpiked was Bury Old Road in 1754 under the control of the Cheetham Hill Trust. Bury New Road, now the main thoroughfare was constructed by a turnpike trust in 1826. Electric trams arrived around 1900, and the route along Bury New Road to Kersal Bar (the location of a toll bar until 1848) was opened on Friday 5 December 1902.

The railway arrived in Prestwich in 1879. The Lancashire and Yorkshire Railway obtained an Act of Parliament for a line from Manchester to Radcliffe in 1872 and in 1876 began building a line through Cheetham Hill, Crumpsall, Heaton Park, Prestwich and Whitefield. A cut and cover tunnel was built at Heaton Park. In 1916 the line was converted to electric operation and operated until August 1991 when it was closed. It was reopened as the Manchester Metrolink in April 1992.

Prestwich is served by four tram stations on the Metrolink line from Manchester to Bury, at Besses o' th' Barn on the Whitefield border to the north, Prestwich in the centre of the village, Heaton Park in the centre-east and Bowker Vale on the Blackley border to the south-east. There are a number of parking spaces at the Besses and Prestwich stops, however, the nearest dedicated park-and-ride station is at Whitefield with over 200 spaces.

Landmarks

Education

Prestwich has four secondary schools: The Heys School, St Monica's High School, Parrenthorn High School and Manchester Mesivta School. Two of these are faith schools, with St Monica's being Catholic and Mesivta Jewish. St Monica's featured a Sixth Form centre offering vocational courses from 2011 but the centre was closed down in 2017, so for both A-level and vocational studies the nearest tertiary education providers are both in Bury, Holy Cross College and Bury College.

Religion
The Parish Church of St Mary the Virgin is a Grade I listed building and was at the centre of the ancient ecclesiastical parish of Prestwich-cum-Oldham that extended beyond the township boundaries. It is known that it had a rector by 1200. Parts of the present building date from around 1500, although extensions were made at the end of the 19th century. For a time in the 19th century, the church was referred to as St Bartholomew's. The church wakes were traditionally held around St Bartholomew's Day. The living of Prestwich was suspended by the Diocese of Manchester in 2002. A priest-in-charge, The Revd. Bryan Hackett, residing in the rectory, was appointed.

The foundation stone of St Margaret's Church was laid near Heaton Park in 1849. Founded as a chapel of ease to the parish church, it became a parish church in its own right in 1885. The church was built as a Commissioners' Church to a design by Travis & Mangnall at a cost of £2,000 and was extended in 1863, 1871, 1884, 1888 and 1899. A feature of the church is the Arts and Crafts Movement oak carved reredos, choir stalls, rood screen, panelling, pulpit, bishop's chair and altar rails by Arthur Simpson of Kendal, widely believed to be the finest collection of his ecclesiastical work. Other Anglican churches in the area include churches dedicated to St Gabriel (built 1933–4, St Hilda (1903–04) and St George (1915).

The Roman Catholic Church had a resurgence in late Victorian times. Mass was celebrated in 1889 for the first time since the Reformation. The present Catholic church, dedicated to Our Lady of Grace, was opened in 1931 and consecrated in 1956.

There are two Methodist churches, Heaton Park Methodist Church and Prestwich Methodist Church. There are cemeteries at the parish church and St Margaret's. The Congregational Church on Bailey Street was originally based in a building designed by Alfred Waterhouse in 1864 and was joined by a school, also by Waterhouse, in 1865. In 2006, the Waterhouse church was redeveloped as flats and a new church (by Z Architecture and Design) was built on an adjacent site.

The migration of Jewish families, mainly from the nearby Cheetham area of Manchester and Broughton Park in Salford, and the later arrival of Muslims into this urban area, resulted in synagogues, such as Heaton Park Hebrew Congregation, and mosques being constructed alongside Christian places of worship. There are Jewish cemeteries at Philips Park Cemetery, Prestwich Village Cemetery was used from 1841 to 1951, and Rainsough Cemetery from 1923. According to Pevsner, the 1934 Holy Law Synagogue was the first "purpose-built" synagogue in Prestwich.

Parks
Richard Buxton (1786–1865), a shoemaker born at Sedgley Hall Farm published a botanical guide to the plants found around the Manchester area in 1849. In the early 20th century James Cosmo Melvill wrote that Kersal Moor, Prestwich Clough, Mere Clough, the Park and Hurst Clough were the homes of most of the interesting plants. Many other noted local botanists had studied the area including Leo Grindon and Thomas Rogers.

In 1906  of land were given to the Prestwich Urban District Council by William Gardner, a further  were purchased and the "sylvan and beautiful" Prestwich Clough was opened to the public as a place of recreation.

Much of the area of the park was industrialised during the 18th and 19th centuries but has been reclaimed with extensive woodlands, reservoirs and grasslands. While this area has become a haven for wildlife, there are still remnants of the area's industrial past. Philips Park has been designated as a Local Nature Reserve (LNR) and Prestwich Clough as a Site of Biological Importance (SBI) due to the important contribution they make to the wildlife heritage of Greater Manchester. The Irwell Sculpture Trail, the Irwell Valley Way and a National Cycle Route all pass through the park. The "Friends of Prestwich Forest Park" and the BTCV co-ordinate volunteer activities and events such as the Prestwich Clough Centenary Celebrations. The renovated Philips Park Barn which has become a major environmental education and countryside centre for the borough and is used by a number of local groups .

Sport
Association football teams representing Prestwich are Prestwich Heys AFC and Prestwich F.C. Prestwich Heys, formed in 1938, played at Grimshaw's off Heys Road but moved to Sandgate Road in Whitefield in 1992. The ground has been redeveloped to include concrete fencing, a car park and club facilities. Prestwich Heys currently play in the North West Counties Football League. Formed in 2005, Prestwich FC originally played in the Bury & District Sunday League. In 2009 the club expanded into open-aged Saturday football and introduced a junior section. As of the 2011–12 season, the first team play in the Lancashire Amateur League Premier Division. The club, officially the football section of Prestwich Cricket, Tennis & Bowling Club, play home games on Grimshaw's, Drinkwater Park and Heaton Park.

Prestwich Marauders FC (est 1972) is a registered FA Charter Standard Development Club, playing their homes games at St Mary's Park, Sandgate and the old Prestwich Hospital cricket ground, off Clifton Road. They play in the Bolton & Bury League and the North Bury League.

Other local sides include Bury Amateurs who play at Drinkwater Park Their teams are in the North Bury League or the Bury and Radcliffe League.

With the area having a largely Irish immigrant community, Gaelic football (GAA) is also present in the area in the form of St. Peter's CLG who operate from, and with the support of, Sedgely Park Rugby Club.

Prestwich Cricket, Tennis & Bowling Club is located between Prestwich Metrolink station and Grimshaw's playing fields off Heys Road. Prestwich CTBC has cricket, crown green bowling, tennis and football facilities and a clubhouse. Prestwich CC First Team are 2011 champions of the Lancashire County Cricket League.

Crown green bowling is played in the area, with teams composed of veterans, ladies, men and mixed teams in different leagues. The Salford League is mixed, the Middleton Sunday Morning and Tuesday evening Leagues, together with the Prestwich and District League are for men, the Prestwich Ladies league is played on Thursday evenings and the Prestwich Veterans League takes place on Tuesday and Friday afternoons. St Mary's Park to the south of Prestwich Village reopened two greens and regular competitions take place on them throughout the winter. There are flat green bowling facilities in Heaton Park which were built for the 2002 Commonwealth Games.

The Prestwich and District Snooker League competes on Thursdays and occasionally on Tuesdays.
Golf is played at Prestwich Golf Club.

Culture and media
The Prestwich and Whitefield Guide and The Bury Times are sold in the locality. The Jewish Telegraph is produced and printed in Prestwich.

The Longfield Centre civic hall has one of the largest sprung floor ballrooms in the northwest of England and has been the host venue for Danceclub2000 since August 1998 was closed by Bury Council in 2021.

There are several private members' clubs in the town including, Prestwich Church Institute,the Carlton Club, Heaton Park Social (Working Men's) Club, and two political clubs—Prestwich Conservative Club and Prestwich Liberal Club.

Sedgley Park

Sedgley Park is an area of Prestwich, bounded to the north by Scholes Lane, to the east by Bury Old Road and to the west by Bland Road/George Street. The district has a large Jewish population, with a number of synagogues. There are many Jewish businesses, shops and delicatessens along Bury New Road, Kings Road and Bury Old Road. The housing is varied, but the bulk of the property is residential interwar semi-detached (1920s and 1930s). Sedgley Park is also home to the Greater Manchester Police training headquarters. There was once a park, to the south-west of Bury Old Road and Scholes Lane, but this has long since been developed with residential property (Lanes Estate). Sedgley Park Teacher Training College was established after the Faithful Companions of Jesus bought a house to accommodate it in 1903. When Mike Leigh was a lecturer at the Catholic women teachers' training college Sedgley Park he devised and directed two big-cast projects for the Manchester Youth Theatre: Big Basil and Glum Victoria and the Lad with Specs . The National Archives holds records relating to the college.

Notable people

 Celia Birtwell, textile and fashion designer and muse of David Hockney, was raised in Prestwich and attended St. Margaret's Primary School.
 Jenny Frost, singer with the band Atomic Kitten and television presenter, grew up in Prestwich and attended the local Catholic high school, St Monica's.
 Liam Frost, musician and singer, grew up in Prestwich.
 Guy Garvey, lead singer of the band Elbow, lives in Prestwich.
 Kevin Godley and Lol Creme of the band 10cc were from Prestwich.
 Alan Haven, jazz organist, was born in Prestwich.
 Howard Jacobson, author and Man Booker Prize winner, was born and raised in Prestwich.
 Montagu Lomax, author of The Experiences of an Asylum Doctor, an exposé of conditions at the Prestwich Hospital
 Abbie McManus, Manchester United and England footballer.
 Arlene Phillips. choreographer, was born in Prestwich.
 Mark E. Smith (1957–2018), lyricist and vocalist of The Fall.
 Julie Stevens was born in Prestwich in 1936 and appeared in episodes of TV series The Avengers, Playschool and Playaway.
 William Sturgeon (1783–1850), physicist and inventor, lived in Prestwich and is buried in St Mary's Cemetery. He created the first practical electric motor and electromagnetic solenoid.
 Betty Tebbs, campaigner for women's rights and peace, lived in Prestwich.
 Emma Jane Unsworth, author, grew up in Prestwich and has also lived there as an adult.
 Victoria Wood, writer, comedian and actress, was born in Prestwich.

See also

 Listed buildings in Prestwich

References

Bibliography

Further reading
 
 Nicholls, W. (1905) History and Traditions of Prestwich. Manchester: Albert Sutton

External links

 
Towns in Greater Manchester
Unparished areas in Greater Manchester
Geography of the Metropolitan Borough of Bury